1993–94 Ukrainian Third League was the second season of the fourth level.

The season started on August 21, 1993, with the last games played on July 3, 1994. It was won by Sirius Zhovti Vody.

Team change
For all relegated and promoted clubs it was a debuting season. FC Nyva Myronivka was officially another club from Karapyshi, Myronivka Raion that moved to Myronivka. Last season Nyva-Borysfen was reorganized and its promotion place was overtaken by a team of Boryspil which was originally sponsoring the Myronivka team.

Relegated team
Only one team was relegated from the 1992–93 Ukrainian Second League.
 CSK ZSU Kyiv – 18th (last) place (debut)

Promoted teams
Six group winners of 1992–93 Ukrainian Football Amateur League and three other teams
 Beskyd Nadvirna – winner of the Group 1 (debut)
 Khutrovyk Tysmenytsia – winner of the Group 2 (debut)
 Hart Borodianka – winner of the Group 3 (debut)
 Sirius Zhovti Vody – winner of the Group 4 (debut)
 Oskil Kupyansk – winner of the Group 5 (debut)
 Surozh Sudak – winner of the Group 6 (debut)
 Medyk Morshyn – admitted (debut)
 Viktor Zaporizhzhia – admitted (debut)
 FC Lviv – admitted (debut)

Reorganized teams
 Nyva Myronivka

Final standings

Notes
 Frunzenets Saky moved to the district center (seat) Saky
 A club from the village of Karapyshi, Myronivka Raion moved to Myronivka and changed its name to Nyva
 Prometei Shakhtarsk changed its name to Silur Shakhtarsk
 Promin Sambor region is from the village of Volia Baranetska in Sambor district, Lviv region
 Electron withdrew from the league on May 5.

Top scorers
Volodymyr Vanin (Viktor) - 27 (8)
Bohdan Bandura (Lviv) - 15
Oleh Buhakov (Oskol) - 15
Oleksandr Novikov (Surozh/Frunzenets) - 15 (4)
Viktor Pobehayev (Hart) - 13 (3)
Yuriy Martynov (Sirius) - 13 (4)
Oleksandr Shemetyev (Frunzenets) - 13 (4)

See also
 Ukrainian Second League 1993–94
 Ukrainian First League 1993–94
 Amateur championship 1993-1994

External links
 Table and results

Ukrainian Third League seasons
4
Ukra